Peyton Kennedy (born January 4, 2004) is a Canadian actress. She is best known for her role as Betty Nelson on the ABC television drama series Grey’s Anatomy (2018–2019). She is also known for her film roles in The Captive (2014), American Fable (2016), and Lavender (2016). She played Kate Messner in the Netflix series, Everything Sucks! (2018), where she played a 15-year-old girl who is trying to figure out her sexuality. She is also known for her role as Dr. O in Odd Squad.

Early life
Kennedy was born on January 4, 2004, in Toronto, Ontario. She attended the Canadian Model and Talent Convention.

Career
Kennedy had a recurring role on the PBS Kids television show Odd Squad (2014–2017). She has also made appearances on numerous other shows, including, Copper, The Ron James Show, Hannibal, Between, Murdoch Mysteries, Killjoys, and Taken.

Kennedy has appeared in the films An Officer and a Murderer (2012), The Captive (2014), Cut Bank (2014), Lavender (2016), American Fable (2016), Odd Squad: The Movie (2016), and XX (2017). She has also starred in the short films, The Offering (2012), To Look Away (2013), Dorsal (2014), and Sunny Side Up (2017).

She starred as Kate Messner in the Netflix series, Everything Sucks! (2018).

Filmography

Podcasts

Awards and nominations

See also
 List of Canadian actors
 List of people from Toronto

References

External links
 
 

2004 births
Living people
21st-century Canadian actresses
Actresses from Toronto
Canadian child actresses
Canadian film actresses
Canadian television actresses
Canadian expatriates in the United States
Canadian expatriate actresses in the United States